Craig Coakley is an Irish lightweight Muay Thai kickboxer currently fighting out of Dublin Combat Academy.

Biography 
Craig Coakley was born in the Irish city of Dublin on 11 December 1992. He started boxing as a child and got into Muay Thai when he was 18 to lose weight. Coakley made his fight debut 3 months after training and won by KO in the third round after breaking his opponent’s nose.

On 25 March 2017, Coakley made his promotional debut for Yokkao. He fought against Myk Eslick and won by TKO (3 knockdowns) in the third round.

On 25 April 2019, Coakley signed a three-year deal with athlete management service, Yokkao Agency.

On 27 July 2019, Coakley fought against Singdam for the WBC Muay Thai Super lightweight Diamond title in Dublin, Ireland. He lost the fight on decision.

Titles and accomplishments

Titles
Golden Belt 4 nations Champion 65 kg
Cage Kings Irish Champion 61.5 kg
Enfusion
 2014 Enfusion 59 kg Tournament Winner

Muay Thai Grand Prix
 2022 MTGP World 63.5 kg Champion

Awards
2016 Irish Fighter of the year

Muay Thai record

|- style="text-align:center; background:#;"
| 2023-04-15
| 
| align="left" | Nathan Bendon
| Road to ONE: Muay Thai Grand Prix 
| London, England
|  
| 
| 
|-
! style=background:white colspan=9 |

|- style="text-align:center; background:#cfc;"
| 2022-11-12
| Win
| align="left" | Natty Dodds
| Road to ONE: Muay Thai Grand Prix London
| London, England
| KO (Elbow) 
| 2
| 
|-
! style=background:white colspan=9 |

|- style="text-align:center; background:#cfc;"
| 2022-09-10
| Win
| align="left" | Kim Falk
| Road to ONE: Muay Thai Grand Prix Liverpool
| Liverpool, England
| Decision (Unanimous) 
| 3
| 3:00
|-
! style=background:white colspan=9 |

|- style="text-align:center; background:#cfc;"
| 2022-04-02
| Win
| align="left" | Panicos Yusuf
| MTGP London 2022
| Liverpool, England
| TKO (retirement) 
| 4
| 3:00
|-
! style=background:white colspan=9 |

|- style="text-align:center; background:#fbb;"
| 2021-12-19
| Loss
| align="left" | Rafi Bohic
| RS Challenge
| Lyon, France
| Decision (Split)
| 3
| 3:00

|- style="text-align:center; background:#FFBBBB;"
| 2021-08-22
| Loss
| align="left" | Mo Abdurahman
| Lion Fight 68
| Bolton, UK
| Decision (Split)
| 5
| 3:00
|-
! style=background:white colspan=9 |

|- style="text-align:center; background:#cfc;"
| 2021-06-25
| Win
| align="left" | Deniz Demirkapu
| Muaythai Night 6
| Abu Dhabi, United Arab Emirates
| Decision (Split)
| 3
| 3:00
|- style="text-align:center; background:#cfc;"
| 2020-03-08
| Win
| align="left" | George Mouzakitis 
| MTGP 34 
| Wolverhampton, United Kingdom
| Decision (Split)
| 3
| 3:00

|- style="text-align:center; background:#FFBBBB;"
| 2019-07-27
| Loss
| align="left" | Singdam
| YOKKAO 42
| Dublin, Ireland
| Decision (Majority)
| 5
| 3:00
|-
! style=background:white colspan=9 |
|- style="text-align:center; background:#FFBBBB;"
| 2019-03-23
| Loss
| align="left" | Mo Abdurahman
| YOKKAO 38
| Bolton, UK
| KO (Spinning back elbow)
| 3
| 2:15

|- style="text-align:center; background:#cfc;"
| 2018-10-13
| Win
| align="left" | Jack Kennedy
| YOKKAO 32
| Bolton, United Kingdom
| TKO (ref stoppage)
| 3
| 2:30
|- style="text-align:center; background:#cfc;"
| 2021-05-26
| Win
| align="left" | Giuseppe Conti
| Wolf Of The Ring
| Figino, Italy
| Decision
| 5
| 3:00

|- style="text-align:center; background:#cfc;"
| 2018-03-10
| Win
| align="left" | Chris Whittle
| YOKKAO 30
| Bolton, UK
| KO
| 1
| 1:40

|- style="text-align:center; background:#cfc;"
| 2017-07-08
| Win
| align="left" | Stephen Meleady
| Capital 1
| Dublin, Ireland
| Decision
| 5
| 3:00
|- style="text-align:center; background:#cfc;"
| 2017-05-27
| Win
| align="left" | Eugenio Donato
| Wolf of The Ring
| Milan, Italy
| KO (Elbows)
| 3
|

|- style="text-align:center; background:#cfc;"
| 2017-03-25
| Win
| align="left" | Myk Estlick
| YOKKAO 23
| Bolton, United Kingdom
| KO (3 knockdowns)
| 3
| 2:25

|-  style="text-align:center; background:#cfc;"
| 2016-10-22 || Win||align=left| Rustam Vyntu || Siam Warriors Superfights: Ireland vs Japan || Ireland|| Decision (Unanimous) || 3 || 3:00

|- style="text-align:center; background:#cfc;"
| 2016-03-26
| Win
| align="left" | Jeremy Nika Zoa
| Cage Kings Dublin #2
| Dublin, Ireland
| TKO (Referee stoppage) 
| 1
| 4:10
|}
Legend:

References

Male Muay Thai practitioners
Irish male kickboxers
1992 births
Living people
Irish Muay Thai practitioners
Sportspeople from Dublin (city)